David Costa may refer to:
David Costa (graphic designer) (born 1947), English graphic designer and musician
David (footballer, born 1977), also known as David Pereira da Costa, (born 1977), Brazilian footballer
David Da Costa (born 1986), Swiss footballer
David Costa (footballer), also known as David Pereira da Costa, (born 2001), Portuguese footballer

See also 
David Costas (born 1995), Spanish footballer